The Evans-Kirby House is a historic house at 611 South Pine Street in Harrison, Arkansas.  It is a two-story wood-frame structure on a sandstone foundation, with a busy roofline and asymmetrical massing typical of the Queen Anne style.  The roof is punctuated with five dormers of different sizes and shapes, and the walls are finished with clapboards and decoratively-cut shingles.  The porch is adorned with spindled friezes and brackets.  The property also includes a period barn/carriage house and garage, the latter over an original smoke cellar.  The house was built in 1895 for Dr. E.L. Evans, who sold it in 1906 to his brother-in-law, Dr. Frank Kirby.

The house was listed on the National Register of Historic Places in 2005.

See also
National Register of Historic Places listings in Boone County, Arkansas

References

Houses on the National Register of Historic Places in Arkansas
Queen Anne architecture in Arkansas
Houses completed in 1895
Houses in Boone County, Arkansas
National Register of Historic Places in Boone County, Arkansas
Buildings and structures in Harrison, Arkansas